Pornography: Men Possessing Women is the third nonfiction book by American radical feminist writer and activist Andrea Dworkin about pornography. It was first published in 1981 by Putnam. An anti-pornography feminist, Dworkin argued that pornography dehumanizes women and that the pornography industry is implicated in violence against women.

Summary
Dworkin analyzes (and extensively cites examples drawn from) contemporary and historical pornography as an industry that hates and dehumanizes women. Dworkin argues that the industry is implicated in violence against women, both in its production (through the abuse of the women that are used to star in it) and in the social consequences of its consumption by encouraging men to eroticize the domination, humiliation and abuse of women.

She outlines the power of men as: 1) a metaphysical assertion of self; 2) physical strength; 3) the capacity to terrorize; 4) the power of naming; 5) the power of owning, 6) the power of money; and 7) the power of sex. The "metaphysical assertion of self" is described as a subject position. Dworkin suggests that men occupy a powerful subject position that is protected by laws and customs, art and literature, documented in history, and upheld in the distribution of wealth. Men have this self (an “unselfconscious parasitism”) and women must, by definition, lack it. The first sign of his parasitism is in his relationship to his mother. He then transfers this to other women in his life and uses women to enlarge himself. Men also have the power of physical Strength. This is not the same as being muscular or strong, but it is the right to physical strength. The capacity to terrorize is the metaphysical assertion of self plus strength which creates fear in a whole class of people (men over women). This happens through rape, battery, sexual abuse, and the use of prostitutes. This behavior is idolized in movies about heroism, war, and glory. In TV, literature, books, drama this story plays out. Men's acts are huge and awesome even when villainous and women become the prize. The power of naming means that men have the ability to define experiences and this is upheld by force. As an example, men name women as “weak” and then further weaken them with preferences and standards of beauty that leave women mutilated and stunted. The power of owning refers to husbands' ownership of wives and fathers' ownership of daughters. This ownership is natural as he is the “one who takes.” Once he has had, it is his. Men also have the power of money. In the hands of women, money buys things, it stays literal. Money in the hands of a woman is sometimes evidence of something foul: unwomanly ambition and greed. For men, money buys women, sex, status, dignity, esteem, loyalty, and all manner of possibility; it brings qualities, achievements, and respect. Money in the hands of a man signifies worth and accomplishment. Wealth of any kind is an expression of male sexual power. Lastly, Dworkin suggests that men have the power of sex although they assert the opposite. The carnality of women is said to be the defining characteristic of women. Women have sexual power because the erection is involuntary and a woman is always the presumed cause, therefore the man is helpless and the woman powerful. The male reacts to a stimulus for which he is not responsible. Whatever he does, he does out of a provocation from a female – she is the temptress. According to Dworkin, men force women to become that thing that causes erection and then holds himself helpless when he is aroused by her. His fury when she is not that thing is intense and powerful.

Chapter Two: Men and Boys 
In this chapter Dworkin argues that the intense preservation of boys and men against male sexual violence further normalizes and sanctions male sexual violence against girls and women. She also states that by society categorizing male sexual violence into heterosexual and homosexual, there are higher concentrated and punitive penalties for male to male sexual violence. She continues to state that, only when women are subsequently secured to a male via a relationship, marriage, or relation, is she afforded the same protection as men.

Reception

Terry Baum has written that the book is a "revelation" and that Dworkin "spoke with the urgency and eloquence of the Biblical prophets."

References

External links
Summary of 'Pornography: Men Possessing Women'
Excerpts from the book

1981 non-fiction books
American non-fiction books
Anti-pornography feminism
Books by Andrea Dworkin
English-language books
G. P. Putnam's Sons books
Non-fiction books about pornography
Radical feminist books